Kadeem Atkins (born 30 November 1991) is a Barbadian international footballer who plays for Barbados Defence Force, as a midfielder.

Career
Atkins has played for Deacons and Barbados Defence Force.

He made his international debut for Barbados in 2010, and has appeared in FIFA World Cup qualifying matches.

References

1991 births
Living people
Barbadian footballers
Barbados international footballers
Barbados Defence Force SC players
Association football midfielders